Bush v. Vera, 517 U.S. 952 (1996), is a United States Supreme Court case concerning racial gerrymandering, where racial minority majority-electoral districts were created during Texas' 1990 redistricting to increase minority Congressional representation. The Supreme Court, in a plurality opinion, held that race was the predominant factor in the creation of the districts and that under a strict scrutiny standard the three districts were not narrowly tailored to further a compelling governmental interest.

Background 
As a result of the 1990 United States Census, Texas was entitled to three additional congressional districts. In a called session in 1991, the Texas Legislature decided to draw one new Hispanic-majority district in South Texas (District 28), one new African-American majority district in Dallas County (District 30), and one new Hispanic-majority district in the Houston area (District 29). In addition, the Legislature decided to reconfigure an existing minority-majority district in the Houston area (District 18) to increase its percentage of African-Americans. The Texas Legislature had developed a state-of-the-art computer system, RedApl, that allowed it to draw congressional districts using racial data at the census block level. Working closely with the Texas congressional delegation and various members of the Legislature who intended to run for Congress, the Texas Legislature took great care to draw three new districts and reconfigure districts that the chosen candidates could win.

The Justice Department precleared the plan under § 5 of the Voting Rights Act of 1965 and it was used in the 1992 election.

Plaintiffs Al Vera, Edward Blum, Polly Orcutt, Ken Powers, Barbara Thomas, and Ed Chen challenged 24 of the state's 30 congressional districts as racial gerrymanders. A three-judge panel of the federal district, consisting of United States Court of Appeals for the Fifth Circuit Judge Edith H. Jones, United States District Judges Melinda Harmon and David Hittner, struck down three Districts (18, 29, and 30) but the decision was stayed pending appeal, so the plan continued in use for the 1994 general election.

Opinion of the Court 
The Court, in a plurality opinion written by Justice Sandra Day O'Connor, found that the plan was subject to strict scrutiny as it was an impermissible racial gerrymander. She repeated what the Court had said in Shaw v. Reno and Miller v. Johnson: Strict scrutiny applies where "redistricting legislation . . . is so extremely irregular on its face that it rationally can be viewed only as an effort to segregate the races for purposes of voting, without regard for traditional districting principles," or where "race for its own sake, and not other districting principles, was the legislature's dominant and controlling rationale in drawing its district lines," and "the legislature subordinated traditional race-neutral districting principles . . . to racial considerations,".

The Court again held that strict scrutiny does not apply merely because redistricting is performed with consciousness of race: that strict scrutiny does not apply in all cases of intentional creation of majority-minority districts, such as the compact districts created by a state court in California. But strict scrutiny does apply where race was the predominant factor in drawing district lines and traditional, race-neutral districting principles were subordinated to race.  The Court found evidence that other factors, including incumbent protection, were considered.

The State argued, for example, that the bizarre shape of District 30 in Dallas County was explained by the drafters' desire to unite urban communities of interest and that the bizarre shape of all three districts was attributable to the Legislature's efforts to protect incumbents of old districts while designing the new ones. The Supreme Court upheld the district court's finding to the contrary, holding that race was the predominant factor, saying that "the contours of Congressional District 30 are unexplainable in terms other than race."

In applying strict scrutiny, the Court again assumed without deciding that complying with § 2 of the Voting Rights Act was a compelling state interest, but found that the districts were not narrowly tailored to comply with § 2 because all three districts were bizarrely shaped and far from compact as a result of racial manipulation. To the extent there was political manipulation, race was used as a proxy for political affiliation. It was race that predominated over all other factors.

Justice O'Connor further noted that: "[B]izarre shape and noncompactness cause constitutional harm insofar as they convey the message that political identity is, or should be, predominantly racial. . . . [C]utting across pre-existing precinct lines and other natural or traditional divisions, is not merely evidentially significant; it is part of the constitutional problem insofar as it disrupts nonracial bases of identity and thus intensifies the emphasis on race."

The court pointed out that, if the minority population is not sufficiently compact to draw a compact district, there is no violation of § 2; if the minority population is sufficiently compact to draw a compact district, nothing in § 2 requires the creation of a race-based district that is far from compact.

A § 2 district that is reasonably compact and regular, taking into account traditional districting principles such as maintaining communities of interest and traditional boundaries, may pass strict scrutiny without having to defeat rival compact districts designed by plaintiffs' experts in endless "beauty contests."

The Court found that the district lines were not justified as an attempt to remedy the effects of past discrimination, since there was no evidence of present discrimination other than racially polarized voting. Since racially polarized voting only served to make a case for a violation of § 2, and the plan was not narrowly tailored to remedy a § 2 violation, the bizarre shapes were not justified.

The Court found that creation of District 18, the reconfigured African-American district in the Houston area, was not justified as an attempt to avoid retrogression under § 5, since it actually increased the African-American voting population from 40.8 percent to 50.9 percent.

Concurrences 
In an unusual move, Justice O'Connor wrote a concurrence to her own opinion in which she expressed her view on two points: first, compliance with the results test of §2 of the Voting Rights Act is a compelling state interest, and second, that the test can co-exist in principle and in practice with Shaw v. Reno and its progeny.

Justice Anthony Kennedy, who joined in the plurality opinion, wrote separately to express his view that anytime a district is drawn with a pre-ordained racial composition that strict scrutiny would apply.

Justice Clarence Thomas issued a concurring opinion in which Justice Antonin Scalia joined which stated that "Strict scrutiny applies to all governmental classifications based on race, and we have expressly held that there is no exception for race based redistricting."

Dissents 
There were two dissents filed in this case, one by Justice John Paul Stevens in which Justices Ruth Bader Ginsburg and Stephen Breyer joined and one by Justice David Souter, in which Ginsburg and Breyer also joined.

See also 
 Wesberry v. Sanders, 
 Wright v. Rockefeller, 
 Shaw v. Reno, 
 Miller v. Johnson, 
 Hunt v. Cromartie, 
 Easley v. Cromartie, 
 Georgia v. Ashcroft, 
 League of United Latin American Citizens v. Perry, 
 Alabama Legislative Black Caucus v. Alabama,

References 
 Bush v. Vera, U.S. Supreme Court Case Summary and Oral Argument

External links 
Thompson, Krissah, "Edward Blum defies odds in getting cases to Supreme Court", Washington Post, February 25, 2013. Bush v. Vera was Blum's first case. In 2013, two more cases challenging racial preferences—in University of Texas admissions and in the Voting Rights Act respectively—and with Blum's active contribution are before the Supreme Court.

United States equal protection case law
United States Supreme Court cases
United States electoral redistricting case law
1996 in United States case law
Gerrymandering in the United States
Congressional districts of Texas
United States Supreme Court cases of the Rehnquist Court
Legal history of Texas
United States racial discrimination case law